Syfy (formerly known as Sci Fi Channel and Syfy Universal) is a Portuguese digital cable, IPTV and satellite television launched on 6 December 2008 and specializes in science fiction, fantasy, and horror shows and movies.

Owned by NBC Universal Global Networks, is the most recent extension of the Syfy brand. Syfy HD was launched on 27 April 2009 on MEO on channel 64; it is now on channel 67.
Syfy Portugal is regulated in Spain by the National Commission on Competition & Markets (CNMC).

Programming
Flash Gordon (2007 TV series)
Seaquest DSV
Knight Rider (1982 TV series)
Knight Rider (2008 TV series)
The Invisible Man
American Gothic
Mutant X
Tremors
Sanctuary
Painkiller Jane
Surface
Gene Roddenberry's Andromeda
Hercules: The Legendary Journeys
Sliders
Quantum Leap
Caprica
Warehouse 13
Game of Thrones
Aftermath
Being Human
Dark Matter
Grimm
Haven
Buffy the Vampire Slayer
Battlestar Galactica
Battlestar Galactica (2004 TV series)
Childhood's End
Doctor Who
Dracula
Ghost Whisperer
Falling Skies
Halcyon
Heroes
Heroes Reborn
Legend Quest
Merlin
Los Protegidos
Primeval: New World
Sanctuary
Fact or Faked: Paranormal Files
School Spirits
The Librarians
The Magicians
Warehouse 13

References

External links
 Official homepage

Television stations in Portugal
Syfy
Science fiction television channels
Portuguese-language television stations
Television channels and stations established in 2008